Hakka TV (Pha̍k-fa-sṳ: Hak-ka Thìen-shì-thôi) is a Hakka language satellite cable channel operated by Taiwan Broadcasting System (TBS) in Taiwan, launched on July 1, 2003.

The Council for Hakka Affairs monitored the station until Taiwanese legislators added it to the Taiwan Broadcasting System in April 2011. It is the only television station in the world that chiefly televises its programmes in the Hakka language. Taiwan Today said, "Hakka TV’s success owes much to its high-quality dramas, many of which draw inspiration from Hakka literature."

See also
Hakka Affairs Council
Media of Taiwan
Han Taiwanese
Taiwanese people

References

External links

Official website 

Television stations in Taiwan
Television channels and stations established in 2003
Taiwan Broadcasting System
Hakka culture in Taiwan
Television in minority languages